The following is a list of events affecting American television in 2000. Events listed include television series debuts, finales, cancellations, and channel initiations, closures and rebrandings, as well as information about controversies and disputes.

Events

January

February

March

April

May

July

August

September

October

November

December

Programs

Debuts

Returning this year

Ending this year

Entering syndication this year

Changes of network affiliation

Miniseries

Television stations

Station launches

Births

Deaths

See also
 2000 in the United States
 List of American films of 2000

References

External links
List of 2000 American television series at IMDb

 
2000s in American television